June Brigman (born October 25, 1960) is an American comic book artist and illustrator. She is best known for creating the preteen superhero characters Power Pack with writer Louise Simonson in 1984. Brigman was the artist of the syndicated newspaper strip Brenda Starr, Reporter from 1995 to 2011 and in 2016 became the artist for the newspaper strip Mary Worth.

Early life
June Brigman grew up in Atlanta. Her artistic influences included Stan Drake, Gil Kane, and Walt Simonson. She attended Georgia State University and the University of Georgia.

Career
Brigman broke into comics with AC Comics in 1983. A sample Astron story (eventually published by AC in 1986) earned her a job with DC Comics in 1984. Later, she worked instead for Marvel Comics, where she worked on Power Pack, a series she penciled on and off until issue #17. For the next seven years, Brigman worked exclusively for Marvel, mostly on short runs; she also contributed illustrations to various editions of The Official Handbook of the Marvel Universe.

Brigman pencilled DC's Supergirl mini-series in 1994, following that with 1995's Dark Horse Comics' Star Wars mini-series River of Chaos (which was written by her former Power Pack collaborator Louise Simonson).

In 1995, Brigman took over as artist for the syndicated newspaper comic strip Brenda Starr, Reporter and stayed on until the strip ended in 2011. In addition, she has illustrated (and colored) the Where in the World is Carmen Sandiego? comic strip for National Geographic World magazine. Brigman also illustrated a series of Star Wars novels and Choose Your Own Adventure books for Bantam Doubleday Dell. In 2005, Puffin Books published Brigman's Black Beauty adaptation graphic novel.

She returned to Marvel in 2010 with a new Power Pack story in Girl Comics #3, teaming up with Simonson  again. Subsequently she pencilled two issues of Herc in 2011. For DC, she pencilled Convergence Superman: Man of Steel #1–2 (written by Louise Simonson) and Convergence Infinity Inc. #2 in 2015. From 2016 to 2017 she created several variant covers for different Marvel series. Also in 2016, Brigman became the artist of the Mary Worth newspaper comic strip.

As a teacher, Brigman has worked at times as an instructor at The Joe Kubert School of Cartoon and Graphic Art in Dover, New Jersey, since 2005. She also worked part-time as a professor of sequential art at the Atlanta branch of Savannah College of Art and Design for several years until summer of 2018.  As of 2021 she currently works as a professor of comic storytelling art at Kennesaw State University's School of Art and Design.

In 2018, she joined new comics publisher Ahoy Comics as penciller and cover artist of Captain Ginger, written by Stuart Moore. The next year, she reunited with Simonson for a Power Pack oneshot for Marvel.

Her husband, Roy Richardson, inked, colored and lettered her syndicated strip Brenda Starr, Reporter and did the same on Mary Worth. 

In April 2022, Brigman was reported among the more than three dozen comics creators who contributed to Operation USA's benefit anthology book, Comics for Ukraine: Sunflower Seeds, a project spearheaded by IDW Publishing Special Projects Editor Scott Dunbier, whose profits would be donated to relief efforts for Ukrainian refugees resulting from the February 2022 Russian invasion of Ukraine. Brigman teamed up with writer Louise Simonson to produce an original story with new characters created specifically for the anthology.

Bibliography

AC Comics 
 Venture #1 (1986)

Ahoy Comics 
 Captain Ginger #1–4 (2018–2019)
 Captain Ginger Season Two #1–6 (2020)
FCBD: Dragonfly and Dragonflyman #1 (Captain Ginger story) (2019)

ComicMix 
 Mine! OGN (Captain Ginger story) (2018)

CrossGen Comics 
 Sojourn #12 (2002)
 Meridian #27–28, 31–32 (2002–2003)

Dark Horse 
Star Wars: River of Chaos #1–4 (1995)

DC 
Convergence Infinity Inc. #2 (2015)
Convergence Superman: Man of Steel #1–2 (2015)
General Mills Presents Justice League #3 (promo) (2016)
Legion of Superheroes vol. 4 #37 (1992)
New Talent Showcase #4 (1984)
New Titans #89 (1992)
Newstime #1 (1993)
Supergirl #1–4 (1994)
Supergirl/Lex Luthor Special #1 (1993)
Who's Who: The Definitive Directory of the DC Universe #13 (1985) 
Who's Who: The Definitive Directory of the DC Universe: Update '87 #4 (1987)

Marvel 
Alpha Flight #45–46, 49–50, 52, 100, Annual #2 (1987, 1991)
Avengers Spotlight #38 (1990)
Barbie #3–4, 8, 12, 19 (1991–1992)
Barbie Fashion #5 (1991)
Captain Planet and the Planeteers #8 (1992)
Cheap Trick: Busted (promo) (1990)
Classic X-Men #29 (1989)
Cloak and Dagger  #11 (1987)
Daredevil Annual #7–8 (1991–1992)
Fantastic Four #5 (2014)
Girl Comics #3 (Power Pack) (2010)
Herc #7–8 (2011)
Marvel Age Annual #1 (1985)
Marvel Comics Presents #36 (1989)
Marvel Fanfare #25, 33 (1986–1987)
Marvel Illustrated: Swimsuit Issue #1 (1991)
New Mutants #56, Annual #4 (1987–1988)
Official Handbook of the Marvel Universe #9, 12 (1983)
Official Handbook of the Marvel Universe Deluxe Edition #5–8, 12–13, 19 (1986–1987)
Power Pack #1–17, 44–45, Holiday Special  (1984–1985, 1989, 1992)
Power Pack: Grow Up #1 (2019)
Savage Sword of Conan #100 (1984)
Sensational She-Hulk in Ceremony #1–2 (1990)
Solo Avengers # 9 (Hellcat co-feature) (1988)
Spider-Man and Power Pack #1 (promo) (1984)
Strange Tales #13–14 (Cloak and Dagger) (1988)
Uncanny X-Men #204 (1986)
Web of Spider-Man Annual #6 (1990)
What The--?! #1 (1988)
X-Factor #20 (1987)

Puffin Books 
 Black Beauty GN (2005)

Teshkeel Comics 
 The 99 #4 (2008)

Topps 
 The Marriage of Hercules and Xena #1 (1998)
 Return to Jurassic Park #9 (1996)

Notes

References

 
 
 Brigman bio, Lambiek.net's Comiclopedia

External links
 
 Brenda Starr at Comicspage

1960 births
American women illustrators
American illustrators
American female comics artists
Inkpot Award winners
Living people
Artists from Atlanta
21st-century American women